Actor (Honarpisheh) is a 1993 Iranian film directed by Mohsen Makhmalbaf. The film features Akbar Abdi as Akbar, Fatemeh Motamed-Aria as his wife, Simin, and Mahaya Petrosian as the gypsy girl. The film is a combination of fiction and reality, since the leading character has the same name and occupation as the actor who portrays the role, while the details and events are fictional.

Plot
An Iranian actor named Akbar is trying to become a serious actor instead of the clown everyone considers him to be. However, financial problems force him to abandon his dream of being an artistic actor. He also has to deal with his family problems and his wife's inability to become pregnant.

External links
 

1993 films
1993 drama films
1990s Persian-language films
Films about actors
Films directed by Mohsen Makhmalbaf
Iranian drama films